Karel Kněnický (30 March 1908 – 9 April 1995) was a Czechoslovak sprinter. He competed at the 1928 and 1936 Summer Olympics in five 100 m – 400 m events in total, but failed to reach the finals.

References

1908 births
1995 deaths
Czechoslovak male sprinters
Athletes (track and field) at the 1928 Summer Olympics
Athletes (track and field) at the 1936 Summer Olympics
Athletes from Prague